Banging on the Doors of Love is the second studio album by Dutch singer-songwriter Sandra van Nieuwland. It was released in The Netherlands by 8ball Music on November 22, 2013.

Singles 

"Hunter" was released as the first single on August 3, 2013. "Always Alone" was released as the second single on November 8, 2013. Both songs were written by Van Nieuwland, Tjeerd Bomhof and Mathias Janmaat.

Track listing 

 "Hunter" – 3:03
 "Always Alone" – 3:24
 "Banging on the Doors of Love" – 3:15
 "Oxygen" – 3:10
 "Empty Hands" – 2:47
 "Snooze Away" – 3:13
 "Tidy & Quiet" – 2:39
 "Love to Love" – 2:55
 "Guilty Trip" – 3:11
 "Happy" – 3:16
 "Sunlight" – 3:52
 "Wait or Forget" – 3:31

References 

Sandra van Nieuwland albums
2013 albums